The City of Wollongong is a local government area in the Illawarra region of New South Wales, Australia. The area is situated adjacent to the Tasman Sea, the Princes Motorway and the Illawarra railway line.

The Lord Mayor of the City of Wollongong Council is Councillor Gordon Bradbery, an independent politician.

Localities

The area covers the northern and central suburbs of Wollongong, bounded by Helensburgh in the north, the Illawarra escarpment to the west, and by Macquarie Rivulet (Yallah, Haywards Bay) and the Lake Illawarra entrance (Windang) to the south.

Demographics
Aboriginal and Torres Strait Islander people made up 2.2 per cent of the population, which was marginally lower than the national and state averages of 2.5 per cent. The median age of people in the City of Wollongong was 38 years, slightly above the national median. Children aged 0 – 14 years made up 18.5 per cent of the population and people aged 65 years and over made up 16.4 per cent of the population. Of people in the area aged 15 years and over, 48.0 per cent were married and 11.5 per cent were either divorced or separated.

When compared with total population growth of Australia for the same periods, being 5.78 per cent and 8.32 per cent respectively, population growth in the City of Wollongong local government area was significantly lower than the national average. The median weekly income for residents within the City of Wollongong was marginally lower than the national average. The forecast population growth from 2006 to 2031 is approximately 0.99% per annum.

Meanwhile, as at the census date, compared to the national average, households in the City of Wollongong local government area had a marginally lower than average proportion (20.2 per cent) where two or more languages are spoken (national average was 20.4 per cent); and a slightly higher proportion (79.4 per cent) where English only was spoken at home (national average was 76.8 per cent).

Council history
The name Wollongong originated from the Aboriginal word woolyungah meaning five islands. Archeological evidence indicates that Aboriginals have lived here for at least 30,000 years. Wodi Wodi is the tribe name of the Aboriginal people of the Illawarra. Dr Charles Throsby first established a settlement in the area in 1815, bringing down his cattle from the Southern Highlands to a lagoon of fresh water located near South Beach. The earliest reference to Wollongong was in 1826, in a report written by John Oxley, about the local cedar industry. The area's first school was established in 1833, and just one year later the Surveyor-General arrived from Sydney to lay out the township of Wollongong on property owned by Charles Throsby-Smith.

The local steel industry commenced in 1927 with Charles Hoskins entering into an agreement with the New South Wales Government to build a steelworks at Port Kembla, thereby commencing a long history of steel production that still continues to this day. Operations began in 1930 with one blast furnace of 800 tons capacity. In 1936, BHP acquired Australian Iron & Steel and production at Port Kembla increased rapidly. The steel industry was a catalyst for growth for many decades, and laid the foundations for the city's economy, lifestyle and culture.

Administrative history

Between July and September 1843, 28 such entities had been proclaimed by Governor George Gipps—the Illawarra District Council, the 17th to be declared, was proclaimed on 24 August 1843, with a population of 4,044 and an area of  covering the coastal plain from Bulli to Nowra and including inland districts such as Kangaroo Valley. Due to various factors, the District Councils were ineffective, and most had ceased to operate by the end of the decade.

The , which gave the councils more authority and which allowed for residents to petition for incorporation of areas and also to elect councillors, met with somewhat greater success. The first elections were held on 29 March 1859, with John Garrett becoming the first mayor of Wollongong.

Other entities sprang into existence thereafter to service the surrounding region. After an unsuccessful attempt by Wollongong to claim the area, the region from Fairy Meadow to Bellambi separately incorporated as North Illawarra on 26 October 1868. Finally, the Shire of Bulli was proclaimed further north on 15 May 1906.

Wollongong was proclaimed as a city on 11 September 1942.

On 10 April 1970, a Lord Mayoralty was conferred on the city by Queen Elizabeth II, and on 30 October 1970, the City reverted to the name "City of Wollongong".

Its motto is "Urbs Inter Mare Montemque"—"City Between the Mountains and the Sea". Its corporate slogan is "City of Innovation".

2008 corruption inquiry
In February 2008, both elected officers and staff of Wollongong City Council were the centre of a major Independent Commission Against Corruption (ICAC) inquiry. The inquiry revealed favourable treatment of local developers by certain council staff. The inquiry heard evidence that a council planner had been sexually involved with three developers whilst assessing their developments. There was also evidence presented of an impersonation of ICAC officers and plans of intimidation. This attracted significant media attention and renewed calls for tightening of rules of developer donations to political parties. The Premier Morris Iemma also agreed that rules would be tightened as several of his Ministers were implicated in this scandal. On 4 March 2008, following recommendations from Commissioner Jerrold Cripps QC, the Minister for Local Government requested the Governor of New South Wales to dismiss the council and install a panel of administrators (Gabrielle Kibble, Dr Colin Gellatly and Robert McGregor) for four years citing clear evidence of systemic corruption in Council.

In October 2008, the ICAC referred briefs of evidence in relation to all eleven persons found to have acted corruptly to the Office of the Director of Public Prosecutions (DPP). After considering the evidence available, the DPP commenced action and was successful in recording convictions for three of the eleven people ICAC found to have acted in a corrupt manner. A summary of the individuals concerned, and the determinations made by the Courts are as follows:

The NSW Government installed administrators to run the council. Dr Col Gellatly, Robert McGregor and Gabrielle Kibble were appointed to the administrator roles, but as of January 2010 Mrs Kibble resigned and was replaced by Richard Colley.

Proposed amalgamation

On 14 February 2017, the NSW Government announced that there would be no amalgamation between Wollongong and Shellharbour council areas.

Council

Current composition and election method
Wollongong City Council is composed of thirteen Councillors, including the Lord Mayor. The Lord Mayor is directly elected while the twelve other Councillors are elected proportionally as three separate wards, each electing four Councillors. Under the  Councillors were elected to hold office until September 2016, however delays due to amalgamation proposals pushed the election back until September 2017, with the council to be elected for a three-year term. The most recent election was held on 4 December 2021 and the makeup of the council, including the Lord Mayor, is as follows: In 2018, as a result of Cr Connor's resignation, there was a by-election held for residents of Ward 3. Ann Martin, Labor, who had previously held a seat on Wollongong Council, was resoundingly elected, with just under 50% of the primary vote.

The current Council, elected in 2021, in order of election by ward, is:

External links

Wollongong City Council

References

 
Wollongong
Wollongong
1859 establishments in Australia